Li Yifang (born 1 February 1975) is a Chinese gymnast. She competed in six events at the 1992 Summer Olympics.

Eponymous skill 
Li has one eponymous skill listed in the Code of Points.

References

External links
 
 
 

1975 births
Living people
Chinese female artistic gymnasts
Olympic gymnasts of China
Gymnasts at the 1992 Summer Olympics
Place of birth missing (living people)
Asian Games medalists in gymnastics
Gymnasts at the 1990 Asian Games
Asian Games gold medalists for China
Asian Games silver medalists for China
Medalists at the 1990 Asian Games
Originators of elements in artistic gymnastics
20th-century Chinese women